The Chioneinae are a subfamily of limoniid crane flies.

This subfamily was known as Eriopterinae until 1992.

Systematics
However, tribe affiliation is taken from Fauna Europaea; thus genera that include no European species are given below. then refined from Savchenko, Oosterbroek & Stary

Tribe Cladurini Mendl, 1979
Chionea Dalman, 1816
Cladura Osten-Sacken, 1860
Crypteria Bergroth, 1913
Franckomyia Alexander, 1936
Neolimnophila Alexander, 1920
Tribe Eriopterini
Arctoconopa Alexander, 1955
Baeoura Alexander, 1924
Beringomyia Savchenko, 1980
Erioptera Meigen, 1803
Gonempeda Alexander, 1924
Gonomyodes Alexander, 1948
Gonomyopsis Alexander, 1966
Hesperoconopa Alexander, 1948
Scleroprocta Edwards, 1938
Styringomyia Loew, 1845
Symplecta Meigen, 1830
Tribe Gonomyiini
Dasymallomyia Brunetti, 1911
Ellipteroides Becker, 1907
Gnophomyia Osten-Sacken, 1860
Gonomyia Meigen, 1818
Gymnastes Brunetti, 1911
Idiocera Dale, 1842
Idiognophomyia Alexander, 1956
Rhabdomastix Skuse, 1890
Teucholabis Osten-Sacken, 1860
Tribe Molophilini Savchenko & Krivolutskaya, 1976
Cheilotrichia Rossi, 1848
Erioconopa Starý, 1976
Hoplolabis Osten-Sacken, 1869
Hoverioptera Alexander, 1963
Ilisia Rondani, 1856
Molophilus Curtis, 1833
Ormosia  Rondani, 1856
Rhypholophus Kolenati, 1860
Tasiocera Skuse, 1890
Unknown tribe
Amphineurus Skuse, 1890
Aphrophila Edwards, 1923
Atarba Osten-Sacken, 1869
Aymaramyia Alexander, 1943
Cryptolabis Osten-Sacken, 1860
Empedomorpha Alexander, 1916
Eriopterella Alexander, 1929
Eriopterodes Alexander, 1970
Eugnophomyia Alexander, 1947
Gymnastes Brunetti, 1911
Horistomyia Alexander, 1924
Hovamyia Alexander, 1951
Jivaromyia Alexander, 1943
Limnophilomyia Alexander, 1921
Maietta Alexander, 1929
Neocladura Alexander, 1920
Neognophomyia Alexander, 1926
Neophilippiana Alexander, 1964
Phantolabis Alexander, 1956
Phyllolabis Osten-Sacken, 1877
Quathlambia Alexander, 1956
Quechuamyia Alexander, 1943
Riedelomyia Alexander, 1928
Sigmatomera Osten-Sacken, 1869
Tasiocerellus Alexander, 1958
Trichotrimicra Alexander, 1921
Unguicrypteria Alexander, 1981

Dicranoptycha Osten Sacken, 1860 and Lipsothrix Loew, 1873 were moved to subfamily Limoniinae.

References

Limoniidae
Nematocera subfamilies